Marie-Jules-Émile Moreau (8 December 1852 – 27 December 1922), better known as Émile Moreau, was a 19th-century French playwright and librettist.

Biography 
Aged 17 he volunteered for the Franco-Prussian War in 1870 and participated to the Côte-d'Or and Armée de l'Est campaigns with general Bourbaki.

In 1887 he was awarded a poetry prize by the Académie française for Pallas Athénée.

The composer Paul Vidal won the first prix de Rome in 1883 with his cantata Le Gladiateur on a libretto by Moreau, and Auguste Chapuis the prix Rossini in 1886 with Les Jardins d'Armide.

He has sometimes been confused with Émile Moreau, the French businessman who was one of the co-founders of the Indian bookstore chain A. H. Wheeler & Co.

Theatre 
1877: Parthénice, à-propos in 1 act and in verse, Comédie-Française
1883: Corneille et Richelieu, à-propos in 1 act and in verse, Comédie-Française
1885: Matapan, comedy in 3 acts and in verse
1887: Protestation, à-propos in verse, Comédie-Française
1890: Le Drapeau, drama in 5 acts with Ernest Depré, Théâtre du Vaudeville
1890: Cléopâtre with Victorien Sardou, music by Xavier Leroux, Théâtre de la Porte-Saint-Martin
1891: L'Auberge des mariniers, drama in 5 acts, Théâtre de l'Ambigu-Comique
1893: Madame Sans-Gêne, comedy in 3 acts and a prologue with Victorien Sardou, Théâtre du Vaudeville
1895: Le Capitaine Floréal, drama in 5 acts with Ernest Depré, Théâtre de l'Ambigu-Comique
1897: La Montagne enchantée, pièce fantastique in 5 acts and 12 tableaux with Albert Carré, music by André Messager and Xavier Leroux, Théâtre de la Porte-Saint-Martin
1899: Madame de Lavalette, drama, Théâtre du Vaudeville
1901: Quo vadis ?, historical drama in 5 acts and 10 tableaux with Louis Péricaud after the eponymous novel by Henryk Sienkiewicz, music by Francis Thomé, Théâtre de la Porte-Saint-Martin
1909: Le Procès de Jeanne d'Arc, historical drama in 4 acts, Théâtre Sarah-Bernhardt
1909: Madame Margot with Charles Clairville, Théâtre Réjane
1912: La Reine Élisabeth, play in 4 acts, Théâtre Sarah-Bernhardt
1920: Le Courrier de Lyon, drama in 5 acts and 6 tableaux with Paul Siraudin and Alfred Delacour, Théâtre de la Porte-Saint-Martin

Bibliography 
 Manfred Le Gant de Conradin, Didot, 1886
 Le Secret de Saint Louis, Delagrave

References

External links 

 Les Archives du spectacle

20th-century French non-fiction writers
19th-century French dramatists and playwrights
People from Yonne
1852 births
1922 deaths